Balitang K is a Philippine television news and current affairs magazine show, hosted by Korina Sanchez and broadcast by ABS-CBN from May 20, 1996 to March 2, 2001. This was Sanchez's first show after Magandang Umaga Po ended.

The program was an offshoot of the Balitang K segment of TV Patrol when Sanchez replaced Mel Tiangco after the latter was suspended from the network until Noli de Castro became the sole anchor of the newscast in 1996. TV Patrol was reformatted in 1996 because of the success of Mexican telenovela, Marimar aired on RPN. To improve the ratings of ABS-CBN, Balitang K was launched as a pre-program to TV Patrol. Balitang K aired after the public service program, Hoy Gising!.

In 2001, TV Patrol anchor Noli de Castro ran for a senate seat and Sanchez was appointed as his replacement. Kris Aquino took over the latter's hosting job in the reformatted spin-off, Balitang Kris. However, this new program was cancelled due to low ratings. Aquino became the host of another talk show, Kris and Tell.

The format of Balitang K was reused for another show, Rated K, also hosted by Sanchez when the show moved to TV5 and was retitled as Rated Korina, after she signed a contract with Brightlight Productions on October 7, 2020. The second incarnation of Rated K premiered on the network's Saturday afternoon block on October 24, 2020.

Segment hosts/reporters
 Julius Babao
 Christine Bersola-Babao
 Cheryl Cosim
 Gilbert Remulla
 Cherie Mercado
 Maricar Bautista
 Mario Dumaual
 Marc Logan
 Kat de Castro
 Doris Bigornia

See also
List of shows previously aired by ABS-CBN
ABS-CBN News and Current Affairs
Magandang Gabi, Bayan

Philippine television shows
Current affairs shows
1996 Philippine television series debuts
2001 Philippine television series endings
ABS-CBN original programming
ABS-CBN News and Current Affairs shows
Filipino-language television shows